In radio, a guard band is an unused part of the radio spectrum between radio bands, for the purpose of preventing interference.

It is a narrow frequency range used to separate two wider frequency ranges to ensure that both can transmit simultaneously without interfering with each other. It is used in frequency-division multiplexing. It may be used in both wired or wireless communications, so that adjacent frequency bands on the same media can avoid interference.

The spectrum can also be licensed for low-power devices such as a private mobile phone network.

References

Radio spectrum